John Neville may refer to:

John Neville, 3rd Baron Neville (c. 1330–1388), English nobleman and soldier
John Neville, Baron Neville (c. 1410–1461), English Lancastrian nobleman and soldier
John Neville, 1st Marquess of Montagu (c. 1431–1471), Yorkist magnate
 Sir John Neville II (by 1488–1541), English courtier, soldier and MP
John Neville, 3rd Baron Latimer (1493–1543), English Peer, second husband of Catherine Parr
John Neville, 4th Baron Latimer (1520–1577), English peer
John Neville (general) (1731–1803), American Revolutionary War officer later prominent in the Whiskey Rebellion
John C. Neville (1815–1898), Wisconsin politician
John Neville (actor) (1925–2011), English-Canadian stage and theater actor
John Neville (died 1420), eldest son of Ralph Neville, 1st Earl of Westmorland
John Elliott Neville, prisoner who died in 2019 after being restrained at the Forsyth County, North Carolina jail 
John T. Neville (1886–1970), American screenwriter

John Nevill may refer to:

John Nevill, 10th Baron Bergavenny (c. 1614 – 1662), English peer
John Nevill, 3rd Earl of Abergavenny (1789–1845), English peer
John Nevill, 5th Marquess of Abergavenny (1914–2000), British peer